The Today's Chinese Version (TCV) (Traditional Chinese: 現代中文譯本; Pinyin: Xiàndài Zhōngwén Yìběn) is a recent translation of the Bible into modern Chinese by the United Bible Societies. The New Testament was first published in 1975, and the entire Bible was published in 1979. The Bible uses simple, easy to read Chinese, and avoids complex and specialist terminology. The New York Times, apparently unaware of the Studium Biblicum Version or the translation by Lü Chen Chung, hailed it as the first Mandarin translation of the Bible since 1919.

Text

TCV is published in two different versions to accommodate the different translations used by Protestants and Catholics. However, the Catholic version is virtually identical to the Protestant version, except for the translations of "Lord", "God", and "Holy Spirit", even though almost all proper names are traditionally transliterated differently. 

In mainland China the TCV is published in simplified Chinese characters by the state-owned Amity Foundation (爱德基金会) in Nanjing, although the Today's Chinese Version is produced and distributed in fewer formats than the Amity Foundation's main version, the Chinese Union Version.

Editions
基督教圣经中英文对照修订版  现代中文译本GNT/TCV 圣经Holy Bible. 双语并排版现代英文译本/现代中文译本. 出版发行：中国基督教两会出版发行. 印刷：南京爱德印刷有限公司 2010

See also
Good News Bible
Chinese Bible Translations

References

Bible translations into Chinese
1979 books
1979 in Christianity